Lophocampa duarteiensis is a moth of the family Erebidae. It was described by Benoît Vincent in 2005. It is found in the Dominican Republic.

References

 Natural History Museum Lepidoptera generic names catalog

duarteiensis
Moths described in 2005